Josselyn Montilla (born 21 March 1985) is a Panamanian footballer who plays as a forward. She has been a member of the Panama women's national team.

International career
Montilla capped for Panama at senior level during the 2014 CONCACAF Women's Championship qualification.

See also
 List of Panama women's international footballers

References

1985 births
Living people
Women's association football forwards
Panamanian women's footballers
Panama women's international footballers